Shamsuddin Ahmed is a politician from Comilla District of Bangladesh. He was elected a member of parliament from Comilla-12 in February 1996.

Career 
Shamsuddin Ahmed was elected a Member of Parliament from Comilla-12 constituency as an Bangladesh Nationalist Party candidate in the Sixth Parliamentary Election on 15 February 1996.

References 

Living people
Year of birth missing (living people)
People from Comilla District
Bangladesh Nationalist Party politicians
6th Jatiya Sangsad members